WQFS (90.9 FM) is Guilford College's student-run radio station, with both students and members of the community serving as disk jockeys. Broadcasting in a variety format, it serves Greensboro, North Carolina and the greater Piedmont Triad area. It is also broadcast on the internet via streaming audio at TuneIn.  WQFS ranked 6th among college radio stations in 2016, according to The Princeton Review.

History
The station started as a student club, The Fine Music Broadcasting Society, in 1965. Guilford College obtained a license from the FCC on October 26, 1966 and, once it had the necessary equipment and funds, WQFS began a daily broadcast schedule on January 6, 1970, broadcasting in an adult contemporary or middle of the road format. By its second year of operation, some disk jockeys began to play what a decade later would become known as college rock. Others would play hybrid programming, which could feature avant-garde jazz, contemporary classical, bluegrass, blues, and Musique concrète, sometimes all within the same program.

One early experiment involved celebrating the second anniversary of the Paul is dead hoax by playing not only Beatles, but other rock, and even classical records backwards, or using the station's two turntables to play a Beatles song forwards and backwards at the same time.

WQFS features a wide variety of genres. The main format is indie rock. About one hundred DJs, half of them Guilford College students, work at the station at any given time. Students serve as station managers.  Their leadership roles include general management, programming, promotions, news, and production.

WQFS plays many local and North Carolina artists.

Long-running shows include David Butler's "The Sunday Morning Rehab Show," Josh Neas' "J's Indie Rock Mayhem," DJ Midnightt's "Garden of Good and Evil," Chris Roulhac's "North Carolina Show." and Mad Dog's "Friday Night Rock Party."

Programming 
All radio shows are independently produced and hosted by volunteer disc jockeys, unless otherwise noted.  Some programs include:
 Captain's World
 Democracy Now! (produced by Democracy Now! and distributed by Pacifica Radio)
 DJ Props
 Dr. Dave's Rocket Science
 Dr. Jive
 Jet Set Jazz Radio with Sergio
 Friday Night Rock Party with Mad Dog
 Garden of Good and Evil
 Gate City Soul
 Gospel Chariot
 Hangin' with Higgs
 J's Indie Rock Mayhem
 Ernie's Jazz Show
 Left of Center
 Metropolitan Radio
 Rock and Roll Revival
 Rock and Roll Study Hall
 Roots and Relics
 Sunday Morning Rehab
 Terri's Too Short Show
 The Caravan with Chef Dave
 The Flava Lab
 The Goddess Flow
 The Idiot and the Oddity
 The Magic Bus with Driver Dale
 The North Carolina Show
 The Old Country Store
 The Roots Cypher
 The Stratosphere
 The X Lounge
 Track Blasters with DJ Clash
 Uncle Bill's Basement
 Weekend Beach Party

References

External links 
 WQFS web site
 Guilford College's WQFS page

Guilford College
QFS
QFS
Radio stations established in 1965